Jason Carl Harper is an American politician serving as a member of the New Mexico House of Representatives from the 57th district. He assumed office on January 15, 2013.

Education
Harper earned his BS in chemical engineering from New Mexico Institute of Mining and Technology, his master's degree in the subject from Purdue University, and his PhD in it from the University of New Mexico.

Elections
2012 With District 57 incumbent Republican Representative Dennis Kintigh redistricted to District 66, Harper was unopposed for the June 5, 2012 Republican Primary, winning with 740 votes and won the November 6, 2012 General election with 4,606 votes (53.2%) against Democratic nominee Donna Tillman.

References

External links
Official page at the New Mexico Legislature
Campaign site

Jason Harper at Ballotpedia
Jason Carl Harper at OpenSecrets

Place of birth missing (living people)
Year of birth missing (living people)
Living people
Republican Party members of the New Mexico House of Representatives
New Mexico Institute of Mining and Technology alumni
People from Rio Rancho, New Mexico
Purdue University College of Engineering alumni
University of New Mexico alumni
21st-century American politicians